Hendrik de Iongh (4 August 1877 – 9 August 1962) was a Dutch fencer. He won a bronze medal in the team sabre event at the 1912 Summer Olympics.

References

External links
 

1877 births
1962 deaths
Dutch male sabre fencers
Olympic fencers of the Netherlands
Fencers at the 1912 Summer Olympics
Olympic bronze medalists for the Netherlands
Olympic medalists in fencing
Sportspeople from Dordrecht
Medalists at the 1912 Summer Olympics
20th-century Dutch people